Egholm is a Danish island in the Limfjord close to Aalborg. Egholm can be reached by ferry from Aalborg within 5 minutes.

External links
 https://web.archive.org/web/20070205043000/http://www.oeturisme.dk/Egholm.htm 

Islands in the Limfjord
Geography of Aalborg Municipality
Towns and settlements in Aalborg Municipality
Aalborg Municipality